Keradere lepidella is a species of snout moth. It is found in Greece, North Macedonia and Turkey.

Its wingspan is about 22 mm.

References

Moths described in 1887
Phycitini
Moths of Europe
Moths of Asia